Miyegombyn Enkhbold (Miyégombīn Enhbold; born 19 July 1964) is a Mongolian politician who was Prime Minister of Mongolia from January 2006 to November 2007 and Deputy Prime Minister from 2007 to 2012. He has been Chairman of the State Great Khural, the Mongolian parliament,from 2016 to 2019.

From 2005 until October 2007, Enkhbold was the Chairman of the Mongolian People's Revolutionary Party (MPRP, later MPP). He also served for a time as Mayor of Ulaanbaatar, the capital. Following his party's defeat in the 2012 general election, he was appointed as Vice Chairman of the State Great Khural. In the 27th Congress of the Mongolian People's Party, he was elected twice as party chairman. In 2016, when the MPP gained control of parliament, he was elected as Chairman of the State Great Khural.

Education and early life 
He finished school in 1982 and started studying in 1983. He earned an undergraduate diploma from the National University of Mongolia majoring in centrally planned economy in 1987.

From 1987, he worked as an economist with the Services Office of the Executive Authority of the Assembly of People's Deputies of Ulaanbaatar. In 1989 he became a specialist to the Department of Planning and Service Mechanics of the Public Services Ministry. In 1991, he returned to become the head of the municipal Services Office. Enkhbold is married and has two children.

Joining MPRP and municipal politics 
Enkhbold joined the MPRP in 1990, the same year when the MPRP Politburo resigned and the democratic process began in Mongolia.

The MPRP appointed Enkhbold as a Deputy Governor of the Chingeltei District of Ulaanbaatar from 1992 to 1996, and as Chairman of the Presidium of the Chingeltei Districts Khural of Citizens Representatives from 1996 to 1997.

The MPRP appointed him as the chairman of the MPRP's Council in Ulan Bator from 1997 to 2005. In 1999, he was elected as mayor of Ulan Bator by the MPRP dominated Ulan Bator's People's Representative's Hural. During his appointment as mayor he worked to re-allocate brownfield land in central Ulaanbaatar for development in order to address the city's well documented housing shortage.

National politics 
Enkhbold contributed to the presidential campaign of  Nambaryn Enkhbayar in 2005. When Enkhbayar became the President of Mongolia, he had to give up the position of Chairman of the MPRP. That position then fell to Enkhbold.

In January 2006, the MPRP decided to withdraw from the coalition, and its ten ministers resigned. This meant that more than half of the ministerial positions were vacant, so the parliament had no choice but to dissolve the government, removing Elbegdorj from power. The MPRP felt strong enough for this step because a DP member in parliament had switched to the MPRP a few days before, giving them exactly half the seats. The votes of four more DP members supporting the change (later to be rewarded with ministerial positions) resulted in an effective MPRP majority. In this configuration, and on the nomination of President Enkhbayar, the parliament approved Enkhbold as the new Prime Minister on January 25, 2006.

Enkhbold submitted his resignation to parliament on November 5, 2007, and parliament accepted it on November 8; Enkhbold remained in office until Bayar was elected on 22 November 2007.

In Bayar's government, Enkhbold was appointed as Deputy Prime Minister on December 5, 2007.

In June 2016, the Mongolian People's Party (the word 'Revolutionary' was dropped from the party name in 2010) gained 85% of the seats in Parliament. The current chairman was unseated and Enkhbold was elected as chairman of the State Great Khural.

References

Sources
news.bbc.co.uk BBC report about the government change
Mongolia Prime Minister M.Enkhbold Resigns Mongolia Prime Minister M.Enkhbold Resigns (The UB Post)

Prime Ministers of Mongolia
Members of the State Great Khural
1964 births
Living people
Mongolian People's Party politicians
Mayors of places in Mongolia
National University of Mongolia alumni
People from Ulaanbaatar
Speakers of the State Great Khural
Deputy Prime Ministers of Mongolia
21st-century Mongolian politicians